John Donald McLean (1820 – 16 December 1866) was a politician and colonial Treasurer of Queensland.

Early life
McLean was born in Kilmuir, Inverness-shire, Scotland, the youngest son of Donald McLean, landowner, and his wife Flora née Nicholson.  McLean emigrated to New South Wales in 1837, and ultimately went largely into squatting pursuits, being at one time interested in no less than forty stations. Latterly he resided on his property at Westbrook, Darling Downs, Queensland.

Political life
On 2 May 1862 McLean was elected to the Queensland Legislative Assembly for Eastern Downs, a seat he held until his death.

McLean was Colonial Treasurer from 21 Jul 1866 until his death. Maclean took office in the midst of a monetary crisis, but quickly restored the equilibrium of the finances, when his career was cut short by a fall from his horse which ended fatally on 16 December 1866 in Westbrook, Queensland.

References

1820 births
1866 deaths
Members of the Queensland Legislative Assembly
Scottish emigrants to colonial Australia
Treasurers of Queensland
19th-century Australian politicians